Seminole was an American country music duo from Florida composed of brothers Jimmy Myers and Donald "Butch" Myers. The duo got their start performing at the Cypress Lounge in Bunnell, Florida. They made their way to Nashville after slipping a demo tape to Mark Miller, the lead singer of Sawyer Brown.

Their debut single, "She Knows Me by Heart", was released by Curb/Universal on August 12, 1997. It peaked at number 69 on the Billboard Hot Country Singles & Tracks chart.

Discography

Singles

Music videos

References

Country music groups from Florida
Country music duos
Curb Records artists
Musical groups established in 1997
Musical groups disestablished in 1998
Sibling musical duos